The Law on the Status of the Descendants of the Petrović Njegoš Dynasty (Montenegrin: Zakon o Statusu Potomaka Dinastije Petrović Njegoš) is a 2011 statute that rehabilitates the Royal House of Montenegro. It was passed in the parliament on 12 July 2011, and was signed by President of the Parliament Ranko Krivokapić. The law “governs the important issues regarding the status of the descendants of the Petrović Njegoš dynasty [for the historical and moral rehabilitation of the Petrović-Njegoš dynasty], whose dethroning was contrary to the Constitution of the Principality of Montenegro, a violent act of annexation in the year 1918.” (Article 1).

Text
The Law on the Status of the Descendants of the Petrović Njegoš Dynasty is reproduced here in full in Montenegrin and English:

References

Petrović-Njegoš dynasty